Bolshevysokovo is a rural locality (a village) in Oktyabrskoye Rural Settlement, Vyaznikovsky District, Vladimir Oblast, Russia. The population was 265 as of 2010. There are 6 streets.

Geography 
Bolshevysokovo is located 24 km southwest of Vyazniki (the district's administrative centre) by road. Maloye Vysokovo is the nearest rural locality.

References 

Rural localities in Vyaznikovsky District